The Wawa 250 Powered By Coca-Cola is a NASCAR Xfinity Series race that is held at Daytona International Speedway. Scheduled as a  race, it is held the night before the NASCAR Cup Series' Coke Zero Sugar 400, and was run on Independence Day weekend until 2019.

Until 2006, there had been a different winner in each race. Dale Earnhardt Jr. became the first repeat winner when he won the 2006 event.

The 2010 running of the event marked the first of four races using the Nationwide Series version of the Car of Tomorrow, the other three being at Michigan, Richmond (September), and Charlotte (October).

Past winners

Notes
Races have been lengthened due to NASCAR overtime 14 times, notable for being the most overtime finishes of any race in the series:

 2012 and 2013 252.5 miles (101 laps)
 2007, 2009, and 2010:  255 miles (102 laps)
 2006, 2014, and 2016: 257.5 miles (103 laps)
 2005, 2015, and 2017: 260 miles (104 laps)
 2008 and 2018: 262.5 miles (105 laps)
 2022: 295 miles (118 laps)

The following races have been rescheduled from their original dates.
  2007: Postponed from Friday night to Saturday morning because of rain.
  2017 and 2021: Race started on Friday night, suspended until Saturday afternoon because of rain.
  2019 and 2022: Race started on Friday and finished after midnight on Saturday after a rain delay.

Multiple winner (driver)

Multiple winners (teams)

Manufacturer wins

Notable moments

2003: Dale Earnhardt Jr. led all 100 laps en route to victory.

2004: First race in which the cars ran a roof spoiler. The last 10 laps involved several lead changes. Dale Earnhardt Jr. took the lead with 10 laps to go. With 3 laps remaining, Michael Waltrip and Jason Leffler passed Dale Jr., putting Waltrip in the lead. Leffler then went for the lead and the two cars raced nose-to-nose for over a lap before Waltrip cut in front of Leffler off Turn Two on the final lap; Leffler hit Waltrip and Waltrip's car spun into the inside wall. NASCAR kept the green flag out (there is often a caution flag when a crash occurs) as Dale challenged Leffler for the lead. Leffler swerved and Dale crashed into the wall in Turn Four, allowing Mike Wallace to pass everyone for the victory. Despite crossing the line second, Leffler was relegated to the last car on the lead lap for aggressive driving, giving Greg Biffle (who finished 3rd) second.

2010: Dale Earnhardt Jr. drove a Chevrolet fielded by Richard Childress and numbered 3 to an unchallenged win. It was Junior's final time to drive the No. 3.

2011: With the new two-car tandem draft in effect, Kevin Harvick Incorporated swept the top four positions in qualifying. The lead changed a then-race record 35 times, primarily between Cup drivers Carl Edwards, Kevin Harvick, Jamie McMurray, Tony Stewart, Clint Bowyer as well as Nationwide Series regulars Aric Almirola, Ricky Stenhouse Jr., Trevor Bayne, and part-timer Danica Patrick. Eric McClure crashed hard after contact with teammate Mike Bliss, requiring a trip to the hospital. At the end of the race, a multi-car pileup involving 16 cars, ensued when Patrick, who had slapped the Turn One wall on the final lap, made contact with Mike Wallace approaching the start-finish line, enabling Joey Logano and Kyle Busch to slip by and finish 1–2. 

2012: Kurt Busch, fired from Penske Racing the year before for several off-track incidents, stormed to the win in the most competitive Daytona race for NASCAR's second-tier touring series in any of its varied incarnations at the time (Late Model Sportsman, Busch Grand National, Nationwide Series).  The lead changed a series track-record 42 times as on the final lap Busch roared past Joey Logano and Elliott Sadler with Ricky Stenhouse Jr. pushing him; Austin Dillon in Richard Childress' No. 3 raced into the fray pushed by Michael Annett in a Richard Petty No. 43; at the stripe Dillon got hit and spun through the trioval grass as Sadler tried for the win at the stripe; Dillon spun back into traffic and a huge crash ensued.

2015: NBC returned to NASCAR with the running of the Subway Firecracker 250 on NBCSN. There were two big ones that happened, one with 10 laps to go and the other one with just 5 laps to go.

2018: Originally Justin Haley was thought to be the winner of the race, but video evidence revealed that he dipped below the yellow line and Kyle Larson had actually won the race. There were two big ones that happened, one with 19 laps to go with 17 cars wrecked and the other one with just 3 laps to go with 11 cars wrecked.

2020: Third Daytona race of the 2020 season.  A 300Km road course event was held on August 15. The event replaced the road course date at Watkins Glen International, which was removed due to the COVID-19 pandemic.

References

External links
 

2002 establishments in Florida
NASCAR Xfinity Series races
 
Recurring sporting events established in 2002
Annual sporting events in the United States